Abdul Quddus Gangohi (1456–1537) was an Indian Sufi scholar.

Life

He was a Sufi poet and Chisti shaykh. He belonged to the Sabiri branch of the Chishti silsila.

Thirty years later, he moved to Gangoh (Saharanpur district), attracted by the reputation of Ahmad Abdul Haqq.

Works

Maktubat (letters of Abdul Quddoos Gangohi Maktubat Quddoosiya) (مکتوبات قدوسیہ اردو ترجمہ)

References

People from Barabanki, Uttar Pradesh
Sufi poets
Hanafis
Maturidis
Indian Sufis
1537 deaths
1456 births
Indian male poets
15th-century Indian poets
16th-century Indian poets
Poets from Uttar Pradesh